Luciano Alghisi (18 April 1917 – 7 November 2004) was an Italian professional football player.

Alghisi was born in Milan in April 1917. He played for 5 seasons (97 goals, 19 goals) in the Serie A for A.S. Roma, A.S. Bari and A.C. Liguria. On his debut in Serie A for Roma, he scored a winning goal in a 1–0 victory over A.C. Milan. He died in Milan in November 2004 at the age of 87.

References

1917 births
2004 deaths
A.S. Roma players
Association football forwards
Calcio Padova players
F.C. Pavia players
Italian footballers
Serie A players
S.S.C. Bari players
U.C. Sampdoria players
U.S. Lecce players
S.S.D. Varese Calcio players
Vigevano Calcio players